Othmar Kühn (5 November 1892 – 26 March 1969) was an Austrian geologist and paleontologist at the University of Vienna who was a member of the Nazi Party, serving in the Wehrmacht as a military geologist during World War II. He worked mainly on Cretaceous stratigraphy and began a catalogue of the fossils of Austria, Fossilium catalogus Austriae.

Life and work 
Kühn was born in Vienna in a business family. After schooling, he joined a business school and worked at a brewery from 1914 before joining the University of Vienna. He served in Italy during World War I and was wounded, receiving a medal for bravery. He studied botany under Richard Wettstein and Carl Diener, receiving a doctorate in 1919. He then worked as a school teacher while also spending time at the Natural History Museum in Vienna. He became a member of the NSDAP and served as a military geologist in eastern Europe. At the end of the War, he had been found to be uninvolved and rehabilitated. He became a rector of the University of Vienna. 

He died at Vienna and is buried at the Döblinger Friedhof.

References

External links 
University of Vienna (biography in German)

1892 births
1969 deaths
Austrian paleontologists
People from Vienna
Nazi Party members